The Gulf South Conference men's basketball tournament is the annual conference basketball championship tournament for the Gulf South Conference. The tournament has been held annually since 1981. It is a single-elimination tournament and seeding is based on regular season records.

The winner, declared conference champion, receives the Gulf South's automatic bid to the NCAA Men's Division II Basketball Championship.

Results

Championship records

Auburn–Montgomery, Lee, and Shorter have not yet qualified for the tournament finals.
Arkansas–Monticello, Lincoln Memorial, Ouachita Baptist, and Southern Arkansas never reached the tournament finals before departing the Gulf South.
 Schools highlighted in pink are former members of the Gulf South Conference

See also
NCAA Division II men's basketball tournament
Gulf South Conference women's basketball tournament

References

NCAA Division II men's basketball conference tournaments
Tournament
Recurring sporting events established in 1981